The women's 200 metres event at the 2014 World Junior Championships in Athletics was held in Eugene, Oregon, USA, at Hayward Field on 24 and 25 July.

Medalists

Records

Results

Final
25 July
Start time: 19:53  Temperature: 27 °C  Humidity: 37 %
Wind: +2.4 m/s

Note:
BIB 1630 Kaylin Whitney - Yellow Card - 162.5(b) Delaying the start

Semifinals
24 July
First 2 in each heat (Q) and the next 2 fastest (q) advance to the Final

Summary

Details
First 2 in each heat (Q) and the next 2 fastest (q) advance to the Final

Semifinal 1
25 July
Start time: 18:08  Temperature: 23 °C  Humidity: 47 %
Wind: +2.5 m/s

Semifinal 2
25 July
Start time: 18:14  Temperature: 23 °C  Humidity: 44 %
Wind: +1.2 m/s

Semifinal 3
25 July
Start time: 18:22  Temperature: 23 °C  Humidity: 44 %
Wind: +1.4 m/s

Heats
24 July
First 3 in each heat (Q) and the next 3 fastest (q) advance to the Semi-Finals

Summary

Details
First 3 in each heat (Q) and the next 3 fastest (q) advance to the Semi-Finals

Heat 1
25 July
Start time: 11:38  Temperature: 20 °C  Humidity: 56 %
Wind: -1.8 m/s

Heat 2
25 July
Start time: 11:45  Temperature: 20 °C  Humidity: 56 %
Wind: -1.8 m/s

Heat 3
25 July
Start time: 11:51  Temperature: 20 °C  Humidity: 56 %
Wind: -1.2 m/s

Heat 4
25 July
Start time: 11:56  Temperature: 20 °C  Humidity: 56 %
Wind: +0.1 m/s

Heat 5
25 July
Start time: 12:02  Temperature: 20 °C  Humidity: 56 %
Wind: +2.1 m/s

Heat 6
25 July
Start time: 12:09  Temperature: 21 °C  Humidity: 53 %
Wind: +1.9 m/s

Heat 7
25 July
Start time: 12:15  Temperature: 20 °C  Humidity: 56 %
Wind: +0.9 m/s

Participation
According to an unofficial count, 50 athletes from 37 countries participated in the event.

References

External links
 200 metres schedule

200 metres
200 metres at the World Athletics U20 Championships
2014 in women's athletics